Isopogon petiolaris is a species of plant in the family Proteaceae and is endemic to eastern Australia. It is a low, spreading shrub with sharply-pointed, divided leaves and more or less spherical heads of yellow flowers.

Description
The flowers are arranged in sessile, more or less spherical heads  in diameter, surrounded by leaves with involucral bracts at the base. Flowering occurs from July to November and the fruit is a hairy nut, fused with others in spherical to oval head  in diameter.

Taxonomy
Isopogon petiolaris was first formally described in 1830 by Robert Brown in the Supplementum to his Prodromus Florae Novae Hollandiae et Insulae Van Diemen from specimens collected in 1827 near Moreton Bay, by Allan Cunningham.

Distribution and habitat
Isopogon petiolaris mostly grows in stony places in forest and heath from the Darling Downs in south-eastern Queensland and south through the Northern Tablelands to near Parramatta and west to the Pilliga forest and Parkes.

References

petiolaris
Flora of New South Wales
Flora of Queensland
Plants described in 1830
Taxa named by Robert Brown (botanist, born 1773)